Opistophthalmus boehmi, the yellow forest scorpion, is a small (around 5 cm - 2 in) scorpion native to southern Africa. It is a burrowing scorpion which can create intricate tunnels and spend days buried at the bottom of its lair.

Behavior
This scorpion is quite nervous and can display defensively. It should not be kept communally, as fights and cannibalism are frequent.  The toxicity of its venom is usually deemed to be low, though its sting can be quite painful.

See also

Scorpion
Arachnids

External links
The page of the family Scorpionidae at The Scorpion Files

Scorpionidae
Scorpions of Africa
Animals described in 1896